Bishop's Castle is a civil parish in Shropshire, England.  It contains 85 listed buildings that are recorded in the National Heritage List for England.  Of these, five are listed at Grade II*, the middle of the three grades, and the others are at Grade II, the lowest grade.  The parish contains the small market town of Bishop's Castle and the surrounding countryside, and all but three of the listed buildings are in the town.  Most of these are houses and other buildings that are basically timber framed dating from the 16th and 17th centuries, and usually encased, refaced or extended later.  The other listed buildings include the remains of a castle, a church and items in the churchyard, farmhouses and farm buildings, a hotel and public houses, a shop, a brewery, the town hall, two milestones, and a telephone kiosk.


Key

Buildings

Notes and references

Notes

Citations

Sources

Lists of buildings and structures in Shropshire
Listed buildings